9 Songs is a 2004 British art romantic drama film written and directed by Michael Winterbottom. The film stars Kieran O'Brien and Margo Stilley. The title refers to the nine songs played by eight different rock bands that complement the story of the film.

The film was controversial upon original release due to its sexual content, which included unsimulated footage of the two leads, Kieran O'Brien and Margo Stilley, having sexual intercourse and performing oral sex as well as a scene of ejaculation. The film was showcased at the Cannes Film Festival.

Plot
The film tells the modern love story set over a period of 12 months in London, England, of a young couple: Matt, a British climatologist, and Lisa, an American exchange student. The story is from Matt's perspective in retrospect when he is working in Antarctica. The film more or less alternates between numerous explicit scenes of sex, and rock concerts, which they mostly attend together. It also shows their weekend getaway into the countryside, their travels around London, and a trip to a strip club. The sex scenes show a variety of different sex acts including fellatio, cunnilingus, female masturbation, masturbation with feet, many scenes of vaginal penetration, and a scene of male ejaculation. There are also scenes where Lisa is blindfolded, and one where Lisa role plays a dominatrix, complete with leather high heels and a whip. At the end of the film, Lisa brings their short and intense relationship to an end at Christmas time when she returns to the United States.

Cast
 Kieran O'Brien as Matt
 Margo Stilley as Lisa

The nine songs
 "Whatever Happened to My Rock and Roll", Black Rebel Motorcycle Club
 "C'mon, C'mon", The Von Bondies
 "Fallen Angel", Elbow
 "Movin' on Up", Primal Scream
 "You Were the Last High", The Dandy Warhols
 "Slow Life", Super Furry Animals
 "Jacqueline", Franz Ferdinand
 "Debbie", Michael Nyman
 "Love Burns", Black Rebel Motorcycle Club

Production
On the first day of filming in the fall of 2003, Margo Stilley and Kieran O'Brien shot a scene where they are just kissing and taking their clothes off. "It wasn't until after lunch that we had sex," O'Brien recalls. As would happen throughout the shoot, Winterbottom left little to chance. "He really mapped out everything," O'Brien says. "The order he wanted me to take off my clothes, her clothes, whether my socks stayed on or not. He had specific ideas of how he wanted our bodies to move. Sometimes, he would start us and then stop and say, 'Let's try this from a slightly different angle,' and then take 15 minutes to reset the shot. I wondered if he remembered the delicate machinery of the male sex organ."

Reception
Derek Malcolm of The Guardian praised the film: "Nine Songs looks like a porn movie, but it feels like a love story. The sex is used as a metaphor for the rest of the couple's relationship. And it is shot with Winterbottom's customary sensitivity."

Radio Times gave a lackluster review, awarding it two stars out of five and claiming: "From the hot, blurry chaos of the gigs to the sparsely furnished flat where the couple unite, this is very much an exercise in style over content. As such, some will find it a rewarding art house experiment with much to recommend it, others watching simply for the explicit and unsimulated lovemaking may well find it boring and pretentious."

Writing for East Bay Express, Luke Y. Thompson claimed: "Michael Winterbottom delivers the sex, and not much else." He continued: "Though there isn't much narrative in effect, Winterbottom does quite literally build to a climax...O'Brien is well endowed, while Stilley is all natural...If the movie were any longer, the onscreen events might become a lot more tedious, but there are just enough different things each time to avoid dull repetition. You may have seen a handjob onscreen, for instance, but have you ever seen a foot job? It's interesting, to say the least."

9 Songs holds a positive score of 24% on Rotten Tomatoes based on 97 reviews with an average rating of 4.38/10. The site's consensus states: "The unerotic sex scenes quickly become tedious to watch, and the lovers lack the personality necessary to make viewers care about them."

Controversy
According to The Guardian, 9 Songs is the most sexually explicit mainstream film to date, largely because it includes several scenes of real sex between the two lead actors. The film is unusual in that it features its lead actors, Margo Stilley and Kieran O'Brien, actually had sex on set, much of which is shown clearly in the film, including genital fondling, masturbation with and without a vibrator (including a footjob in a bathtub scene), penetrative vaginal sex, cunnilingus and fellatio. During a scene in which Stilley gives O'Brien a handjob after performing fellatio on him, O'Brien became the only actor who has been shown ejaculating in a mainstream, UK-produced feature. To avoid a possible pregnancy, O'Brien wore a condom on his erect penis during the vaginal sex but not while receiving oral sex. Margo Stilley initially asked Winterbottom to refer to her simply by her character's name in interviews about the film.

The release sparked a debate over whether the scenes of explicit sex artistically contributed to the film's meaning or crossed the border into pornography. In the United Kingdom, the film received an 18 certificate from the British Board of Film Classification and became the most explicit mainstream film to be so rated in the country. MP Ann Widdecombe complained about the film in the UK House of Commons and calling on the Home Secretary to reverse the decision to release it uncut.

In Australia, the Office of Film and Literature Classification gave the film an X rating, which would have prevented the film from being shown theatrically and restricted sale of the film to the Australian Capital Territory and Northern Territory. The OFLC Review Board later passed the film with an R rating, although the South Australian Classification Council raised the rating back to X in South Australia.

In New Zealand, while the Society for the Promotion of Community Standards lobbied for the film to be kept out of cinemas, it was passed uncut at R18 by the Office of Film and Literature Classification. The film was broadcast on New Zealand pay TV Rialto Channel in July 2007.

In June 2008, the film was broadcast on Dutch national television by the public broadcasting station VPRO.

See also
 Unsimulated sex

References

Further reading 

 Frey, Mattias. (2016) Extreme Cinema: The Transgressive Rhetoric of Today’s Art Film Culture. London: Rutgers University Press.
 Johnson, Beth. (2016) ‘Sex, Drugs and Rock and Roll: Analysing Aesthetics, Performance and Pleasure in 9 Songs’, in L. Coleman (ed.) Sex and Storytelling in Modern Cinema: Explicit Sex, Performance and Cinematic Technique. London ; New York, NY: I.B.Tauris, pp. 137–158.
 Kenny, Oliver. (2022) ‘Breaking Conventions? Political Ideology of Films With Explicit Sex’, Open Screens, 5(1), pp. 1–21. https://doi.org/10.16995/OS.8008
 Krzywinska, Tanya. (2006) Sex and the Cinema. London: Wallflower.
 Williams, Linda. (2007) ‘Hard-Core Art Film: The Contemporary Realm of the Senses’, Quaderns portàtils, (13), pp. 1–20.
 Williams, Linda. (2008) Screening Sex. Durham, NC: Duke University Press.
 Williams, Melanie. (2006) ‘9 Songs’, Film Quarterly, 59(3), pp. 59–63.

External links
 
 
 
 
 
 9 Songs at Yahoo! Movies
 9 Songs at The New York Times

Films about sexuality
2004 films
2000s erotic drama films
2004 independent films
2004 romantic drama films
British LGBT-related films
British romantic drama films
2000s English-language films
Films directed by Michael Winterbottom
Bisexuality-related films
Films set in London
Films shot in London
Films shot in Norway
British independent films
British erotic drama films
LGBT-related controversies in film
Obscenity controversies in film
British musical films
Concert films
2000s British films